The 1954 Mount Druitt 24 Hours Road Race was an endurance race for production cars staged at the Mount Druitt circuit in New South Wales, Australia from 31 January to 1 February 1954. The race, which was organized by the Australian Racing Drivers' Club, was the first motor race of 24 hours duration to be held in Australia. Cars were required to be stock models, competing as purchased with no modifications permitted other than the removal of the silencer. All starters finished the race, with those that had retired rejoining to cross the finish line at the end of the 24 hours. 

The race was won by Geordie Anderson, Chas Swinburne and Bill Pitt driving a Jaguar XK120 Coupe.

Results

Notes
 Entries: 28
 Starters: 22
 Finishers: 22
 Start format: Le Mans-style
 Start time: 2pm
 Distance covered by winning car: Approximately 1,260 miles (2,029 km)

References

Auto races in Australia
Mount Druitt 24 Hours Road Race
Motorsport in New South Wales
Sports competitions in New South Wales
January 1954 sports events in Australia
February 1954 sports events in Australia